Bumblebee/Shining Eyes/1:30 is a 7" picture disc by North Carolina indie rock band The Comas.

Track listing
"Bumblebee"
"Shining Eyes"
" – 1:30"

2001 EPs
The Comas albums